Epicrocis hilarella is a species of snout moth in the genus Epicrocis. It was described by Ragonot in 1888. It is found in China and Taiwan.

References

Moths described in 1888
Phycitini
Moths of Japan